Eric Godon (born 7 February 1959) is a Belgian character actor, director and writer. Recognisable by his burly appearance and deep voice, he is perhaps best known in English language circles, for his roles in In Bruges, and The Missing.

Life and career
Godon studied Germanic Philology in Brussels, and was a member of the Belgian Junior national football team. He began his acting career at the age of 42. He is largely self-taught, and is well versed in improvisation.

He speaks many languages, which have proven useful in his international acting career. In addition to his native language (French), he is fluent in Dutch, Flemish, English and German, and is also reasonable in Hebrew, Spanish, Italian and Russian.

He is pursuing an international career. After Fishing Without Nets, an American independent film by Cutter Hodierne shot in Kenya, he played the character of mayor Georges Deloix in the first series of the BBC drama The Missing. In 2015, he appeared alongside Sean Bean in the recurring role of older Ivanenko in the TNT series Legends, an American TV series produced by Fox 21 for the TNT network.

Filmography

Actor

Director / Writer

References

External links 
official site

1959 births
Living people
21st-century Belgian male actors
Belgian male film actors